Torrechiva is a municipality in the comarca of Alto Mijares, Castellón, Valencia, Spain.

Municipalities in the Province of Castellón
Alto Mijares